Galehgah (also Romanized as Galehgāh; also known as Galāgāh and Galū Gāh) is a village in Tarom Rural District, in the Central District of Hajjiabad County, Hormozgan Province, Iran. At the 2006 census, its population was 253, in 53 families.

References 

Populated places in Hajjiabad County